Škofija is a small settlement in the Municipality of Šmarje pri Jelšah in eastern Slovenia. It lies in the hills north of Zibika. The municipality is included in the Savinja Statistical Region and was part of the historical region of Styria.

References

External links
Škofija at Geopedia

Populated places in the Municipality of Šmarje pri Jelšah